Victoria Hand is a fictional supporting character appearing in American comic books published by Marvel Comics, in particular those featuring the American espionage organization S.H.I.E.L.D. of which Hand was a member.

Saffron Burrows portrayed the character in the first season of the Marvel Cinematic Universe TV series Agents of S.H.I.E.L.D., while Rachele Schank portrayed her younger self in the seventh season.

Publication history
Victoria Hand was created by Brian Michael Bendis and Mike Deodato. Her first appearance was in The Invincible Iron Man #8 by the creative team of Matt Fraction and Salvador Larroca, although her subsequent appearance in Dark Avengers #1, by Bendis and Deodato, predates this in continuity.

Hand appeared as a supporting character throughout the 2010-2013 New Avengers series from issue #1 (Aug. 2010) through the character's death in issue #32 (Dec. 2012).

Fictional character biography
Hand was initially introduced as a S.H.I.E.L.D. accountant, dating a fellow agent named Isabelle - a partner with different beliefs about the fight against criminals and terrorists. Three years before the Secret Invasion storyline, Victoria sent a letter to S.H.I.E.L.D. director Nick Fury about his war on terrorism and her concerns that he was doing a poor job. Isabelle implored Victoria not to send the letter. The result was Hand's transferral to a S.H.I.E.L.D. Base in Portland, Oregon. Hand's relationship broke down due to Isabelle's anger over her advice being ignored.

During the "Dark Reign" storyline, Norman Osborn was promoted from director of Thunderbolt Initiative to the head of S.H.I.E.L.D. upon which he dismantled it and transformed it into the operation known as H.A.M.M.E.R. He appointed Victoria to the position of Deputy Director of this organization due to her vocal opposition of previous S.H.I.E.L.D. directors Nick Fury and Tony Stark. She willingly supported Osborn's agenda to subvert the heroes and place villains instead, believing that Osborn would bring peace to the world. Victoria also has a certain level of authority over Norman's Avengers despite the fact Norman gave Moonstone the position of his second-in-command. She was also given the task of finding an acronym for H.A.M.M.E.R.

Norman Osborn received word from Victoria Hand that they have apprehended Maria Hill.

Victoria was sent with Moonstone to neutralize Bruce Banner (AKA the Hulk), Osborn reasoning that Banner's intellect is a greater threat than the Hulk's brute strength. She and Moonstone engaged a powerless Bruce Banner and Skaar. H.A.M.M.E.R. gave the duo the means to restore Banner's gamma powers, something Skaar was waiting for (as he had sworn to kill his true "father"). With Banner coated in gamma radiation the duo left, their mission accomplished.

Victoria was part of the attack that went after the Asgardians, where she was leading the helicarrier squad. During the attack, the ship she was on was heavily damaged and Victoria ordered the evacuation of the crew. When the Void took full control of Robert Reynolds' body, Iron Man informed her to leave the ship as he intended to use the Helicarrier as a giant bullet. After the battle, Victoria didn't resist arrest and was taken on to a Helicarrier, where she was interviewed by Captain Steve Rogers. Victoria said that she didn't regret anything and that she was trying to help the world. In response, Steve gave her a position in his new team, which surprised Victoria.

It was later revealed that she had been assigned by Captain Steve Rogers to be the liaison for Luke Cage's team of Avengers, dubbed the New Avengers, because Rogers feels that she can provide an important insight to the team. Spider-Man in particular does not trust her due to her old contact with Osborn, to the extent that he refuses to reveal his secret identity to her even when it means that he will not get paid for his work on the team. Luke's wife Jessica Jones also does not trust Hand, mainly because Hand nervously pointed a cannon at her and their infant daughter when they met in the Avengers mansion. Hand was contacted by the remnants of H.A.M.M.E.R. to ask her to join them; instead, she provided the meeting location to the New Avengers so that they could sabotage the meeting. The subsequent assault resulted in the potentially fatal injury of Mockingbird.

During a later confrontation with Superia (head of this branch of H.A.M.M.E.R.), Hand claimed that her betrayal of H.A.M.M.E.R. was actually a ruse intended to convince Steve Rogers that her allegiance is with him after H.A.M.M.E.R. contacted her on a public line rather than through more secret channels. She then provided the New Avengers with the location from which the H.A.M.M.E.R. agents were going to be recovered, allowing the Avengers to capture Superia and use an experimental serum she was trying to steal to treat Mockingbird. Spider-Man's suspicions of Hand eventually prompted him to leave the New Avengers (although this was due in part to his new responsibilities in the Future Foundation), informing the rest of the team that she would eventually turn on them due to her old ties to Norman Osborn. Spider-Man eventually returned to the team.

After Osborn's second incarnation of the Dark Avengers launched their attack, Hand revealed to the New Avengers that she was actually a triple agent, pretending to work for Captain America while pretending to work for Norman Osborn while really working for Captain America, subsequently helping the New Avengers set a trap for Osborn to try and rescue the captured Captain America after Daredevil's heightened senses confirmed that she was telling the truth.

Victoria is possessed by Daniel Drumm's ghost during his revenge attack on the New Avengers for what happened to his brother Doctor Voodoo. Under Daniel Drumm's possession, she was forced to kill Daimon Hellstrom and Jennifer Kale. After Doctor Strange dispatched her in the Avengers Mansion and brought her to the Astral Plane, Victoria Hand was killed by Daniel Drumm. After a long battle with two Avengers teams, Drumm is defeated. A statue of Victoria Hand was erected at the Avengers Mansion. While the group is collected around it, Captain America declared that Hand was "one of us".

In other media

Victoria Hand appears in the Marvel Cinematic Universe series Agents of S.H.I.E.L.D., portrayed by Saffron Burrows. Introduced in the season one episode "The Hub", this version is the titular S.H.I.E.L.D. base's director. Upon learning of Hydra infiltrators, she leads in a team in weeding them out. In the process, she captures S.H.I.E.L.D. turncoat John Garrett is exposed as a double agent with the intention of sending him to S.H.I.E.L.D. base, the Fridge, but is killed by Grant Ward. Additionally, a young, alternate timeline version of Hand appears in the series finale, "The End is At Hand" and "What We're Fighting For", portrayed by Rachele Schank. Following the Chronicoms' attack on S.H.I.E.L.D.'s bases in 1983, Hand and the surviving agents regroup at a New York safe house and help the present day S.H.I.E.L.D. agents return to their time.

References

External links
 Victoria Hand at Marvel Wiki
 Victoria Hand at Comic Vine

Avengers (comics) characters
Characters created by Brian Michael Bendis
Characters created by Mike Deodato
Comics characters introduced in 2008
Fictional accountants
Fictional American secret agents
Marvel Comics LGBT characters
Marvel Comics television characters
S.H.I.E.L.D. agents